Fernando Massano Tomé (born 10 July 1947 in Porto) is a Portuguese former football midfielder and manager. His career was mostly associated to Vitória de Setúbal, as both a player and coach.

Honours
Vitória Setúbal
Taça de Portugal: 1966–67

Sporting CP
Primeira Liga: 1973–74
Taça de Portugal: 1970–71, 1972–73, 1973–74

References

External links

1947 births
Living people
Portuguese footballers
Footballers from Porto
Association football midfielders
Primeira Liga players
Liga Portugal 2 players
Vitória F.C. players
Sporting CP footballers
U.D. Leiria players
Portugal under-21 international footballers
Portugal international footballers
Portuguese football managers
Primeira Liga managers
Liga Portugal 2 managers
U.D. Leiria managers
F.C. Penafiel managers
Vitória F.C. managers
F.C. Famalicão managers